The 1869 Tower Hamlets by-election was fought on 8 November 1869.  The by-election was fought due to the incumbent Liberal MP Acton Smee Ayrton becoming First Commissioner of Works and Public Buildings.  It was retained by Acton Smee Ayrton who was unopposed.

References

Tower Hamlets by-election
Tower Hamlets,1869
Tower Hamlets by-election
Tower Hamlets,1869
Unopposed ministerial by-elections to the Parliament of the United Kingdom in English constituencies
Tower Hamlets by-election